Ralph Álvarez (born 1955 in Cuba) is a Cuban-American businessman and the former president and chief operations officer of McDonald's Corporation.

Education
Álvarez was born in Cuba. In 1976, he earned a bachelor's degree in business administration from the University of Miami School of Business at the University of Miami in 1976.

Career
Álvarez began his career with Burger King and Wendy's. He was subsequently appointed president and chief operations officer of McDonald's USA and later as president of McDonald's North America.

Citing chronic knee pain, Álvarez announced his retirement from McDonald's effective December 31, 2009. He was previously rehired and given a second chance after being forced out in 1998 for having an affair with a subordinate.

As of December 2012, Álvarez is on the board of directors of Dunkin' Donuts.

References

External links
Ralph Álvarez biography at McDonalds.com.

1955 births
American chief operating officers
Cuban emigrants to the United States
Living people
McDonald's people
University of Miami Business School alumni